Plenary Group is an Australian infrastructure investment business specialising in public–private partnerships. It was founded in 2004 by three former ABN Amro employees, with Deutsche Bank taking a 20% shareholding.

Operations
Projects which it has been in include:

Australia
G:link
Melbourne Convention and Exhibition Centre
Northwest Rapid Transit
Toowoomba Second Range Crossing
Victorian Comprehensive Cancer Centre
High Capacity Metro Trains

Canada
GrandLinq
Humber River Regional Hospital
Milton District Hospital

United States 

 Plenary Roads Denver - first U.S. project: 2014-2016 Denver-Boulder US36 Express Lanes

References

Companies based in Melbourne
Deutsche Bank
2004 establishments in Australia
Investment companies of Australia
Caisse de dépôt et placement du Québec companies